George Pilkington (18 September 1879 – 17 April 1958) was a South African painter. His work was part of the painting event in the art competition at the 1948 Summer Olympics.

References

1879 births
1958 deaths
20th-century South African painters
South African male painters
Olympic competitors in art competitions
People from Cape Town